10 Cent Wings is an album by the American musician Jonatha Brooke, released in 1997. It was her only album for MCA Records. The title refers to an ad a venue once ran to promote a Brooke live show. "Crumbs" was the first single.

The album peaked at No. 34 on Billboard'''s Heatseekers Albums chart. Its singles were hits on adult album alternative radio stations.

Production
The album was produced by Brooke's husband, Alain Mallet. "Glass Half Empty" is about the deceased musician Kevin Gilbert. Duke Levine contributed guitar parts to the album.

Critical receptionThe Washington Post wrote that "at times Brooke stretches her literary conceits too far, but her keyboardist-producer-arranger-husband Alain Mallet always wraps her appealing melodies in quirky, thickened chamber-pop arrangements." Entertainment Weekly praised Brooke's "complex, intensely melodic tunes and her uncliched, heartfelt poetry." The New York Times concluded that Brooke "ventures further into torchy folk-pop with high literary aspirations."

The Los Angeles Daily News thought that the "startlingly mature collection is eclectic and electric with Brooke supplying acoustic guitar and emotionally charged, first-rate material." The Chicago Tribune determined that "while her strong new album ... doesn't completely sidestep the occasional cliché, the songs generally showcase a noteworthy artistry." The Indianapolis Star stated that Brooke's "conversational style is accessible and perfectly suited for her musical tone—folky and earth-toned, with strings, horns and electronics painting some of the backdrop."

AllMusic wrote that "Mallet pastes together various genres without meshing them, and often the verses, chorus and bridge each have a radically different style." No Depression determined that Brooke "made exactly the right record at exactly the right time—1997’s 10 Cent Wings, released the same year Lilith Fair made her brand of classy female-centric folk-pop all the rage—and found herself bounced from the major-label ranks for her trouble." The Milwaukee Journal Sentinel'' listed the album as the sixth best of 1997.

Track listing

References

Jonatha Brooke albums
1997 albums
MCA Records albums